Arguments that prophecies of Muhammad exist in the Bible have formed part of Muslim tradition from the early history of Muhammad's Ummah (Arabic: أُمّة community). A number of Christians throughout history, such as John of Damascus and John Calvin, have interpreted Muhammad as being the Antichrist of the New Testament.

Muslim theologians have argued that a number of specific passages within the biblical text can be specifically identified as references to Muhammad, both in the Hebrew Bible/Old Testament and in the Christian New Testament. Several verses in the Quran, as well as several Hadiths, state that Muhammad is described in the Bible. On the other hand, scholars have generally interpreted these verses as referring to the community of Israel or Yahweh's personal soteriological actions regarding the Israelites or members of the faithful community, such as in the cases of Isaiah 42. The apocryphal Gospel of Barnabas, which explicitly mentions Muhammad, is widely recognized by scholars as a fabrication from the Early Modern Age. Some Muslim theologians also claimed the Paraclete (Greek New Testament) as Muhammad, although scholars identify it with the Holy Spirit.

Muslim interpretation

According to the Quran 
Quran 3:81, Quran 7:157, and Quran 48:29 are often cited in this context. Quran 61:6 says that Jesus brought good news about the close advent of Muhammad. Muslim historians and hagiographers (such as Ibn Ishaq) maintained that the people of Medina accepted Islam because of their awareness of these prophecies, and because they saw Muhammad as fulfilling them.

Deuteronomy 18:18 

Quran 46:10 refers to this prophecy. Al-Samawal al-Maghribi, a Jewish mathematician who embraced Islam, pointed to it in his book Confutation of the Jews as a prophecy fulfilled by Muhammad. Samawal argued in his book that since the children of Esau are described in Deuteronomy 2:4-6 and Numbers 20:14 as the brethren of the children of Israel, the children of Ishmael can also be described the same way.

Deuteronomy 33:2 

Al-Samawal al-Maghribi referred to this verse also in his book as a prophecy of Muhammad. He said that Mount Sinai refers to Moses, Mount Seir "the Mount of Esau" refers to Jesus, and Mount Paran "the Mount of Ishmael" refers to Muhammad. Since then, many Muslim scholars have looked to Deuteronomy 33 as containing a prophetic prediction of Muhammad.

Deuteronomy 33:2 is part of the poem known as the Blessing of Moses spanning Deuteronomy 33:1-29. Scholars consider that the poem serves as a Yahwistic declaration for the blessing of the future of Israel as a socially unified whole that will benefit and prosper through YHWH's beneficence. The poem relates YHWH's movement from the south from Mount Sinai, the mountain where He resides, to His entrance on the scene as a "formidable invading force."

Isaiah 42 

Muslim tradition holds that Isaiah 42 predicted the coming of a servant associated with Qedar, the second son of Ishmael, who went on to live his life in Arabia, and so interpret this passage as a prophecy of Muhammad. 

In 1892, Isaiah 42:1-4 was first identified by Bernhard Duhm as one of the Servant songs in the Book of Isaiah, along with Is. 49:1-6; Is. 50:4-7; and Is. 52:13-53:12. The Old Testament identifies the servant of the Servant songs as the Israelite's in Is. 41:8-9; Is. 44:1; Is. 44:21; Is. 45:4; Is. 48:20 and Is. 49:3. John Barton and John Muddiman write that "The idea of a 'servant' played a small part in the earlier chapters, being used as a designation of the unworthy Eliakim in 22:20 and of the figure of David in 37:35, but it now comes to the fore as a description of major significance, the noun being used more than 20 times in chs. 40-55. Its first usage is obviously important in establishing the sense in which we are to understand it, and here it is clear that the community of Israel/Jacob is so described."

Song of Songs 5:16

The Hebrew word  (desirable, lovely) in Song of Songs 5:16 has been argued to mean Muhammad.

Daniel 7 

This text has been interpreted by Muslims as a messianic prophecy about Muhammad and his ascension to the Throne of God. According to Muslims, the first beast represents Babylon. The second beast represents Persia-Media. The third beast represents Greece. The fourth beast represents Rome. The horns of the fourth beast represent the emperors of the Roman Empire. The ten horns refer to the ten Roman emperors who ran the 10 major persecutions. The 11th horn refers to Constantine I. Constantine I plucked out three Roman emperors before him, maintained authority for 3 times and half a time (34 lunar years), and persecuted those who rejected the Nicene Creed. He broke the first commandment of the law "the Lord our God is one lord", and switched the Sabbath to Sunday.

Haggai 2:7 

The word rendered "the Desire" is singular and is pronounced as Hemdāh (from the root HMD). Christians have maintained from their early history that this word was a reference to the Messiah. Muslim scholars argue that it actually refers to Muhammad whose name is also from the same root (HMD). Some of them interpret the new temple in the prophecy as a reference to the Great Mosque of Mecca.

Synoptic Gospels

Parable of the Wicked Husbandmen

Muslim scholars like Rahmatullah Kairanawi have discussed this parable in detail. Rahmatullah Kairanawi interpreted the landowner as a metaphor for God, the vineyard as a metaphor for God's Law, the wall around it refers to that which God prohibited in the Law, the wine-press is a metaphor for the pleasures that are permitted in the Law. The husbandmen who rented the vineyard refers to the Jews. The servants who were sent repeatedly to the tenants to collect the fruits are God's prophets. The son of the landowner is a metaphor for Jesus, who is considered by Muslims to be one of the highly esteemed prophets. The stone the builders rejected is seen as a metaphor for Muhammad. Rahmatullah quoted this phrase from the parable: "Anyone who falls on this stone will be broken to pieces; anyone on whom it falls will be crushed" and argued that this description fits Muhammad who triumphed during his life-time over all his enemies and against all odds. Muslims have also quoted the following Hadith of Muhammad in this context:

Parable of the Mustard Seed

Rahmatullah Kairanawi, among other Muslim writers, argued that this parable is referred to in Qur'an 48:29. Rahmatullah argued that the Muslim Ummah resembled the growing mustard seed in that it started from a single person in Mecca, yet it grew up rapidly and became larger than the other kingdoms of earth. It put forth its branches in the East and West and many nations lived within it.

The kingdom of heaven has come near

Rahmatullah quotes Matthew 3:2 and Matthew 4:17 and says that both John the Baptist and Jesus Christ preached that "the kingdom of heaven has come near". Neither of them preached that the kingdom of heaven has arrived. He also quotes Matthew 6:9-13 which shows that Jesus taught his disciples to pray so that the kingdom of heaven comes. Rahmatullah argues that this shows that the seed of the kingdom of heaven wasn't planted in earth at that time.

John 1:15 

Muslim scholars have believed that, in John 1:15, John the Baptist refers to prophets coming after Jesus. Among most Christians, this prophecy refers to Jesus, and among Muslims, it has been argued that this prophecy refers to Muhammad, rather than Jesus.

John 16 

 
Many Muslims believe that the Paraclete in this passage from the Gospel of John is referring to Muhammad. The first record connecting the Paraclete in John to Muhammad is recorded in Ibn Ishaq's Kitab al-Maghazi in the second half of the 8th century, and the passage of the Paraclete had a pre-Islamic history of being tied to leaders of heterodox Christian sects, such as the Montanists tying the Paraclete to the founder of the sect Montanus, and the Manichaeans doing so with Mani. Ibn Ishaq alters the Johannine passage several times when translating it into Arabic in order to make it consistent with Islamic teachings on Muhammad, and so while the passage says that Jesus is responsible for sending the Paraclete, Ibn Ishaq rewrites this to say that God sent the Paraclete, and Ibn Ishaq also replaces all references of "the Father" with the Arabic term for "Lord" in order to accommodate for the Islamic teaching that God is no Father to anyone. A few Muslim commentators, such as David Benjamin Keldani (1928), have argued the theory that the original Greek word used was periklytos, meaning famed, illustrious, or praiseworthy, rendered in Arabic as Ahmad (another name of Muhammad), and that this was substituted by Christians with parakletos. There are currently no known Greek manuscripts with this reading (all extant Greek manuscripts read παράκλητος parakletos), although the earliest manuscript evidence available is from the 4th century. It appears that the Ahmad reading was a misreading of the Gospel text by means of an itacism. The Greek parakletos may have been transcribed into a Semitic language as prqlyt, which was in turn read as perikletos and further then rendered as Ahmad via a literal translation. Evidence for this misinterpreted process comes from a citation of the Syriac version of the Gospel of John by Ibn Hisham in his Sirat an-Nabi, explaining how this passage was taken as predicting the coming of Muhammad. Furthermore, prophet figures claiming to be the Paraclete of John was already a well-established tradition, having already been done by Marcion, Mani and Montanus prior to the advent of Islam.

In contrast to this, scholarship recognizes that the Paraclete, or Advocate, is mentioned five times throughout John's Gospel (John 14:16-17; 14:26; 15:26-27; 16:7-11; 16:13-17). The Advocate, called the "Spirit of Truth", is considered the Holy Spirit – a replacement for Jesus into the world after Jesus leaves, still dependent on Christ (14:6) and sent by the Father at Jesus' demand (14:16, 24). The Spirit is said to permanently remain with the disciples (14:18-21). John's Gospel says that the world cannot receive the Spirit though the Spirit can abide within the disciples (14:17). The Spirit will accuse the world of sin (16:9) and glorify Jesus (16:14), and though it is "the spirit that gives life", the spirit does not add new revelations to those of Jesus. Jesus' promise to send the Advocate in the Gospel of John is later fulfilled in John 20:19-23 as Jesus bestows the Spirit upon his disciples.

8th century Christian commentary 
In Łewond's version of the correspondence between the Byzantine emperor Leo III the Isaurian and the Umayyad caliph Umar II, the following is attributed to Leo:

Gospel of Barnabas 
The Gospel of Barnabas (as distinguished from the Epistle of Barnabas and the surviving Acts of Barnabas) is not a part of the Bible, and is generally seen as a fabrication made during the Renaissance.

The name of "Muhammad" is frequently mentioned verbatim in the Gospel of Barnabas, as in the following quote:

Christian interpretation 

Middle Age Christian writers claimed that Muhammad was predicted in the Bible, as a forthcoming Antichrist, false prophet, or false Messiah. According to historian Albert Hourani, initial interactions between Christian and Muslim peoples were characterized by hostility on the part of the Byzantines because they interpreted Muhammad in a biblical context as being the Antichrist. The earliest known exponent of this view was John of Damascus in the 7th or 8th century. In the Reformation era, John Calvin (16th century) argued that "The name Antichrist does not designate a single individual, but a single kingdom which extends throughout many generations", saying that both Muhammad and the Catholic popes were "antichrists".

Daniel 7 
The prophecy of the "Four kingdoms of Daniel" in Chapter 7 of the Book of Daniel has been interpreted by Christians as a prediction of Muhammad. The monk Eulogius of Córdoba (9th century) argued that Muhammad was the Fourth Beast in the prophecy. Another medieval monk, Alvarus, argued that Muhammad was the "eleventh king" that emerged from the Fourth Beast. According to historian John Tolan:

New Testament

Matthew 24 
In c. 850 CE about 50 Christians were killed in Muslim-ruled Córdoba, Andalusia, after a Christian priest named Perfectus said that Muhammad was one of the "false Christs" prophesied in Matthew 24:16-42. Eulogius of Córdoba justified the views of Perfectus and the other Martyrs of Córdoba, saying that they witnessed "against the angel of Satan and forerunner of Antichrist, ... Muhammad, the heresiarch."

Revelation 9 
According to Martin Luther (16th century), Muhammad was "The Second Woe" in the Book of Revelation 9:13–21.

See also 
 Old Testament messianic prophecies quoted in the New Testament
 Tahrif

Notes

References

Bibliography 

 
 

 
 
 
 
 

Bible-related controversies
Christianity and Islam
Islam and Judaism
Prophecy in Islam
Prophecy in Christianity
Bible